Hit Radio is a Moroccan leading radio station established in 2008 in Rabat, broadcasting news and recent hits from all over the world in addition to talents from Morocco and the Arab World. It also publishes its own greatly followed weekly Top 30 singles chart. According to the station, 40% of its output is on young Moroccan artists.

The station has also developed internationally with stations of similar format in Africa and parts of Europe, most notably Portugal, Senegal and Togo.

Programming 

 Momo Morning Show - 
 Top 30 - Morocco's top 30 songs
 Hit Radio Party Mix - Late night mixshow airings every Friday and Saturday night. Armin van Buuren's A State of Trance, Nicky Romero's Protocol Radio, UMF Radio, and Adam K's Revealed Selected air Saturday nights. Tiesto's Club Life, R3hab's CYB3RPVNK Radio, The Martin Garrix Show, and Afrojack's Jacked Radio air Friday nights

Frequencies

External links

2006 establishments in Morocco
Radio stations established in 2006
Radio stations in Morocco